Crom Cruach was a pagan god of  pre-Christian Ireland. According to Christian writers, he was propitiated with human sacrifice and his worship was ended by Saint Patrick.

He is also referred to as Crom Cróich, Cenn Cruach/Cróich and Cenncroithi. He is related to the later mythological and folkloric figure Crom Dubh.

The references in a dinsenchas  ("place-lore") poem in the 12th century to sacrifice in exchange for milk and grain suggest that Crom had a function as fertility god. The description of his image as a gold figure surrounded by twelve stone or bronze figures has been interpreted by some as representing the sun surrounded by the signs of the zodiac, suggesting a function as solar deity.

Name 
Crom Cruach's name takes several forms. Crom (or cromm) means "bent, crooked, stooped" or according to O'Reilly is perhaps related to cruim meaning "thunder". Cenn means "head", and by extension "head, chief". Cruach (or crúach) is a noun meaning "pile, heap, mound, stack", generally of grain, hay, peat or other gathered goods, booty, and so on, including slaughtered fighters. A common extension is its reference to hills or mountains that look like stacks or piles.

Crom Cruach is called the chief Celtic idol of Ireland by Michael J. O'Kelly, and was located on Magh Slécht (The Plain of Prostrations) in County Cavan, surrounded by twelve other idols.

Literary references 

According to an Irish dinsenchas ("place-lore") poem in the 12th century Book of Leinster, Crom Cruach's cult image, consisting of a gold figure surrounded by twelve stone figures, stood on Magh Slécht ("the plain of prostration") (pronounced Moy Shlokht) in County Cavan, and was propitiated with first-born sacrifice in exchange for good yields of milk and grain. An early High King, Tigernmas, along with three quarters of his army, is said to have died while worshipping Crom on Samhain eve, but worship continued until the cult image was destroyed by St. Patrick with a sledgehammer.

This incident figures prominently in medieval legends about St. Patrick, although it does not appear in his own writings, nor in the two 7th century biographies by Muirchu and Tírechán. However J.B. Bury, infers that there is a missing passage in Tírechán about Crom Cruaich; L. Bieler, who edited the two biographies, is non-committal on the point.

In the 9th century Tripartite Life of Saint Patrick the deity is called Cenn Cruach, and his cult image consists of a central figure covered with gold and silver, surrounded by twelve bronze figures. When Patrick approaches it he raises his crozier, the central figure falls face-down, with the imprint of the crozier left in it, and the surrounding figures sink into the earth. The "demon" who inhabits the image appears, but Patrick curses him and casts him to hell. Jocelin's 12th century Life and Acts of St. Patrick tells much the same story. Here the god is called Cenncroithi, interpreted as "the head of all gods", and when his image falls the silver and gold covering it crumble to dust, with the imprint of the crozier left on bare stone.

Archaeology 
A decorated stone known as the Killycluggin Stone (meaning 'the Wood of the Bell-Shaped Stone') has been interpreted by some as the cult image of Crom Cruach. It was found at Killycluggin, County Cavan. It was discovered broken in several pieces and partly buried close to a Bronze Age stone circle (54.090773, -7.634122), inside which it probably once stood.

The 14th century Book of McGovern, written in Magh Slécht, contains a poem which states that Crom was situated at Kilnavert beside the road and that the local women used to tremble in fear as they passed by. There is still a local tradition in the area that the Killycluggin Stone is the Crom stone.

There is another standing stone identified with Crom Crúaich in Drumcoo townland, County Fermanagh. It has the figure of a man walking engraved on it, representing either Saint Patrick or a druid, depending on when it was engraved. A nearby street is named Crom Crúaich Way after it.

A large wooden idol from the 4th century AD has recently been discovered in Gortnacrannagh, County Roscommon.

See also 
Cermand Cestach
 Crom Dubh
Macroom
Metrical Dindshenchas
Annals of the Four Masters

References

Further reading
 Collins, Claire. "St. Patrick vs. Cenn Cruaich in the Patrician Lives: Elements of Narrative", 2015. Irish Conference of Medievalists
 White, Kevin. "The Plain of Blood: A Study of the Ritual Landscape of Magh Slecht, Co. Cavan"

Irish gods
Solar gods
Human sacrifice
Irish legendary creatures
Cyclopes